The Colombia national rugby union team is classified as a tier three nation by World Rugby. They have thus far not qualified for a Rugby World Cup, but have participated in qualifying tournaments. Colombia made their debut against Mexico in 1996. In 2018, the Colombians won their first significant international honour, winning the inaugural  Americas Rugby Challenge, the 'B' championship to the Americas Rugby Championship.

The national side is ranked 33rd in the world (as of 20 March 2021).

History

Colombia attempted to qualify for the 2003 Rugby World Cup in Australia, participating in the Americas qualifying tournaments during November 2001. They contested matches in the Round 1 (South) group, against nations including Brazil, Venezuela and Peru in Round 1.

Colombia was involved in qualifying for the World Cup (France 2007) in 2004 when they contested Round 1b (CONSUR 2nd division). They finished fourth in the final standings which knocked them out of contention, though their fixtures against Peru and Venezuela were close, losing 15-10 and 27-31 respectively.

Rugby has little support by the government or media, as football (soccer) has a stronger tradition in the country.
The Colombian rugby team is called Los Tucanes.

The team has competed in the B Division of the South American Rugby Championship since its second edition in 2001. It won the competition in 2009, and again, three times in a row in 2014, 2015 and 2016. However, there is no direct promotion to the A Division; to win promotion it must beat the lowest-place team in the A Division in a playoff.

In an attempt to qualify for the 2019 edition of the Rugby World Cup, Colombia showed some progress. Colombia easily beat Ecuador 75-5 then went on to defeat Peru 41-14 and Venezuela 35-10 progressing the team to the next round. This involved Colombia playing Mexico in a Pan-American qualifier, which Colombia won 29-11. Colombia's final qualifying match was played against Paraguay who had come in last place in 2015 South American championship Division A. This was the end of the road for Colombia as they gallantly lost this match 39-27.

After winning Sudamericano B three times in a row (Apartadó 2014, Lima 2015 and Lima 2016), Sudamérica Rugby promoted Colombia to the top tier of South America, alongside Uruguay, Chile, Brazil and Paraguay, to start in 2018. The competition changed its format, and a South American Six Nations was played in May 2018. This tournament included the Top 5 teams of South America and Argentina XV. Colombia will have another important competition each year, and it will be Americas Rugby Championship B. This new competition will be structured as the second tier competition of the Americas, after Americas Rugby Championship. Paraguay, Colombia, Mexico and Trinidad and Tobago will play it on a yearly basis. The possibility of promotion and relegation between tiers is under study.

World Cup record

 1987 - Not invited
 1991 - Did not enter
 1995 - Did not enter
 1999 - Did not enter
 2003 - Did not qualify
 2007 - Did not qualify
 2011 - Did not qualify
 2015 - Did not qualify
 2019 - Did not qualify

Current squad

The following squad was selected to play the 2015 South American Rugby Championship repechage against Brazil.

Head Coach: Raul Vesga

Jaider Pemberthy Muñoz (Antioquia)
Manuel Correa Quintana (Antioquia)
Emanuel Mendoza Mosquera (Antioquia)
Andrés Quintero Espinosa (Antioquia)
Jhoann Mantilla (Santander)
Gerson Ortiz Cañas (Antioquia)
Ferney Rodríguez (Antioquia)
Sebastían Mejía Gil (Antioquia) (c)
Jeferson Borja Restrepo (Antioquia)
Emmanuel Bedoya Pulgarín (Antioquia)
Pablo Lemoine Arboleda (Bogotá)
Camilo Cadavid Cardona (Antioquia)
Brayan Campino Riascos (Valle)
Dani Giraldo Mesa (Antioquia)
Jhon Urrutia (Antioquia)
Vásques Eduardo Montoya (Antioquia)
Mauricio Espinal Vargas (Antioquia)
Juan Gabriel Dávila Metaute (Antioquia)
Andrés Tarazona (Lyon OU)
Andrés Echeverri (Antioquia)

See also
 Colombia national rugby sevens team
 Rugby union in Colombia
 Sports in Colombia

References

External links
 Colombia on WorldRugby.com
  on RugbyData.com

South American national rugby union teams
National team
Rugby union